Melissa Anne Gorman (born 11 December 1985) is an Australian long-distance swimmer who specialises in long-distance freestyle and open-water events.

Career
At the 2006 Commonwealth Games, Gorman won a silver medal in the 800 m freestyle.

At the 2008 Summer Olympics, Gorman finished 15th in the Women's 10 km open water marathon and 17th in the 800 m freestyle.

At the 2009 World Aquatics Championships, Gorman stunned Olympic champion Larisa Ilchenko to win gold in the women's 5 km.

At the 2010 Commonwealth Games, Gorman won a bronze medal in the 800 m freestyle.

At the 2010 Pan Pacific Swimming Championships, Gorman won a gold medal in the women's 1500 m freestyle and set a new Commonwealth record.

At the 2012 Summer Olympics, Gorman finished 10th in the women's 10 km open water marathon.

See also
 List of World Aquatics Championships medalists in swimming (women)
 List of Commonwealth Games medallists in swimming (women)

References

External links
 
 
 
 
 
 

1985 births
Living people
Australian female freestyle swimmers
Female long-distance swimmers
Olympic swimmers of Australia
Swimmers at the 2008 Summer Olympics
Swimmers at the 2012 Summer Olympics
Swimmers at the 2006 Commonwealth Games
Swimmers at the 2010 Commonwealth Games
Commonwealth Games silver medallists for Australia
Commonwealth Games bronze medallists for Australia
Sportswomen from New South Wales
Medalists at the FINA World Swimming Championships (25 m)
Swimmers from Sydney
World Aquatics Championships medalists in open water swimming
Commonwealth Games medallists in swimming
21st-century Australian women
Medallists at the 2006 Commonwealth Games
Medallists at the 2010 Commonwealth Games